Henrico Drost (born 21 January 1987) is a Dutch footballer who plays as centre-back.

Club career
Born in Kampen, Drost started his senior career in 2005 with SC Heerenveen, where he was usually a bencher. Heerenveen loaned him out to Excelsior, De Graafschap and VVV-Venlo.

In the summer of 2010 Drost signed a two-year contract with RKC Waalwijk after leaving Heerenveen on a free transfer. In the summer of 2013, Drost signed with NAC Breda for two seasons, to leave them for Excelsior on a free in 2015. Drost returned to RKC in the Eerste Divisie in the summer of 2017. 

In the summer of 2020, he switched to ASWH in the Tweede Divisie. In his first season, he played in 3 out of ASWH's 6 league games. In the fall season of 2011, he played in 10 of ASWH's 12 league games. In the winter break of 2021, he left ASWH, as his family needed to relocate. At the start of 2022, he joined VV Jubbega.

Personal life
Henrico Drost is the twin brother of former professional football player Jeroen Drost.

Honours

Club
Heerenveen
KNVB Cup: 2008–09

RKC Waalwijk:
Eerste Divisie: 2010–11

References

External links
 

1987 births
Living people
People from Kampen, Overijssel
Association football central defenders
Dutch footballers
Netherlands youth international footballers
Netherlands under-21 international footballers
SC Heerenveen players
Excelsior Rotterdam players
De Graafschap players
VVV-Venlo players
RKC Waalwijk players
NAC Breda players
Eredivisie players
Eerste Divisie players
Dutch twins
Twin sportspeople
ASWH players
Footballers from Overijssel